The 1978 Washington summit was the 5th NATO summit bringing the leaders of member nations together at the same time. The formal sessions and informal meetings in Washington, D.C. took place on May 30–31, 1978. This event was only the fifth meeting of the NATO heads of state following the ceremonial signing of the North Atlantic Treaty on April 4, 1949.

Background
In this period, the organization faced unresolved questions concerned whether a new generation of leaders would be as committed to NATO as their predecessors had been.

Synopsis 
 Meeting with participation of Heads of State and Government
 Long-term trends in east–west relations
 Berlin and Germany
 Review of CSCE implementation at Belgrade
 Achievement of NATO Science Committee, 20th Anniversary
 Need to strengthen South Eastern flanks
 Concern at continual Warsaw Pact expansion of offensive capabilities
 SALT
 MBFR
 Leaders of States participating in NATO integrated defence approve LTDP and call for follow-through action by national authorities.

See also
 EU summit
 G8 summit

Notes

References

External links
 NATO update, 1978

1978 in politics
Summit of 1978
1978 Washington summit
Diplomatic conferences in the United States
20th-century diplomatic conferences
1978 in international relations
1978 conferences
1978 in the United States
1978 in Washington, D.C.
United States and NATO
May 1978 events in the United States